Dragon's beard candy or Chinese cotton candy or Longxusu is a handmade traditional art of China. It is a traditional Chinese confectionary similar to floss halva or Western cotton candy, which can be found in many Chinese communities. Dragon's beard candy was initially created in China, but soon spread in popularity in other parts of East Asia and became a regional delicacy in other parts of East Asia such as South Korea, as well as (and more recently) Canada, Turkey, Singapore, and the United States.

It has a low sugar content (19%) and low saturated fat content (2%). By comparison, cotton candy is fat free with a very high sugar content (94%). Dragon's beard candy has a very short shelf life. It is highly sensitive to moisture and tends to melt when exposed to higher temperatures, notably during warm weather.

History
According to legend, Dragon's Beard Candy was invented during the Chinese Han Dynasty by an imperial court chef who entertained the Emperor one day by performing the complicated steps in making a new confection, which involved stretching a dough-like mixture composed from rice flour into small, thin strands. These strands reminded the Emperor of a dragon's beard, and were sticky enough to adhere to one's face easily, so the concoction was named Dragon's Beard Candy. The name may also be attributed to the status of the mythical dragon as a symbol of the Chinese Emperor, so presenting the confection as Dragon's Beard Candy was deemed acceptable due to the social nature of the candy. It was reserved only for the ruling class due to the complexity of the preparation process. 

Dragon's Beard Candy became a source of conflict several centuries later, however, as during the Chinese Cultural Revolution the Red Guard, acting on the orders of the Chinese Communist Party, forbade the Chinese populace to take part in activities that could be attributed to the Han Dynasty. The initial rarity of the candy, combined with government policy banning the art, made the craft of making Dragon's Beard Candy even more isolated and sparsely practiced. Nevertheless, in recent years, the art has resurfaced in tourist destinations such as street festivals, and has even spread to farther reaches of the globe through dedicated masters of the task.

Preparation

Traditionally, Dragon's Beard Candy is made from sugar and maltose syrup, although recipes based on corn syrup are now used in the United States. The main ingredients of Dragon's Beard Candy include approximately 75 grams of fine white sugar, 75 grams of peanuts, 75 grams of desiccated coconut, 38 grams of white sesame seeds, 150 grams of maltose syrup, and 1 bowl of glutinous rice flour. Due to the presence of large amounts of syrup, the candy has a very high sugar content.

For preparation of Dragon's Beard Candy, the preparer must initially boil and melt the saturated maltose solution (which may include sugar or corn syrup) for 5 minutes until thickened, followed by leaving the mixture to chill for 10 minutes until a semisolid state is reached. This resulting mass, which is somewhat flexible or elastic, is then formed into a torus. Next, the preparer must take the gooey sugar, corn syrup, or sugar cane based gel and dip it into the sugar dough. Thirdly, the gooey chunk must be shaped into a ring resembling a doughnut, the key feature being the large hole. This step must by followed by repeatedly pulling, twisting, stretching, and folding the dough over on itself, doubling the number of strands created after each repetition. While the candy is being folded, it is recommended to keep the dough covered in toasted glutinous flour to prevent it from sticking to surfaces. The dough must then be stretched into paper-thin strands, where each strand should be three to four inches long. Then, the strands should be tangled into a circular shape, and dipped into corn flour to keep the strands from sticking together. Finally, the ring should be cut into small pieces and wrapped around crushed peanuts, sesame seeds, crunched chocolate, or coconut inside. Specific Dragon's Beard Candy filling depends on several factors, such as region, purpose, and respective chef.

The candy is recommended to be consumed immediately after its preparation is complete, but it should remain fresh for up to six minutes in proper conditions.

Comparison to Western cotton candy
Both cotton candy and Dragon's Beard Candy are made of sugar and share the characteristic of notable stickiness and a high sensitivity to moisture. Both substances will clump together when exposed to the air for a certain amount of time. However, cotton candy has a larger surface area, thus allowing a small amount of sugar to generate into a greater volume of product. Its serving on each stick is 37 grams, including food dyes and flavor, containing around 110 calories per serving. While Dragon's Beard Candy contain a lower content of sugar (7.2 grams), it contains a slightly higher caloric content of 141.2, as well as a higher fat content (6.1 grams), compared to Western-style cotton candy, typically containing 0g of fat. This is due to the fact that in addition to sugar, Dragon's Beard is composed of peanuts, sesame seeds and other ingredients, while cotton candy is close to 100% sugars. The nutritional value of the wrapping alone is essentially identical to cotton candy's.

Presentation
It is common for street vendors of Dragon's Beard Candy to carry out the folding process involved in preparation of the confection at their stall, which can attract customers fascinated by the process as much as by a desire to purchase the candy. However, customers can purchase Dragon's Beard Candies through online stores.

See also
Cotton candy
Kkultarae - a Korean variant
Pashmak - a Persian variant
Pişmaniye - a Turkish variant
Sohan papdi - an Indian variant
Tanghulu
Deuk Deuk Tong
White Rabbit Creamy Candy
Orange jelly candy

References

External links
 About Asia's Dragon's Beard Candy Master 
 Singapore's version of the Dragon's Beard Candies 
 Bamboo Garden Icy-Crispy Dragon Beard Candy
 Noodles And Rice: Dragon Beard Candy
 DRAGON BEARD CANDY 龍鬚糖 
 Department of Journalism and Communication, Hong Kong Shue Yan University – 香港樹仁大學新聞與傳播學系
 International News Report on Dragon Beard Candy
 The Dragon Beard Candy Show
 Dragon Papa Dessert - San Francisco, CA

Candy
Chinese confectionery